Nesticus constantinescui  is a species of araneomorph spider of the family Nesticidae. It is endemic to Romania.

Original publication

External links 
 Nesticus constantinescui Dumitrescu, 1979, Catalogue of Life
 Nesticus constantinescui, Fauna Europaea

Nesticidae
Spiders described in 1979
Spiders of Europe
Endemic fauna of Romania